Joseph Hansen or Hanson may refer to:
 Joseph Hansen (dancer) (1842–1907), Belgian dancer and choreographer
 Joseph Hansen (historian) (1863–1943), German historian of witchcraft trials
 Joseph Hansen (socialist) (1910–1979), American socialist leader
 Joseph Hansen (writer) (1923–2004), American crime writer
 Joseph T. Hansen (born 1943), American labor leader
 Joseph Hansen (rower) (born 1979), American rower and 2004 Olympic gold medalist

See also 
 Lily Hanson (Joe Hanson, born 1983), American writer and comedian